"Lacquer Head" is the first single from Primus' 1999 album, Antipop. It has three verses about three children, and the harm that comes to them from huffing inhalants.  MTV banned the single's music video for its drug references and purportedly 'violent content', despite its anti-drug theme. The song was produced by Limp Bizkit frontman Fred Durst, who encouraged the band to return to the more aggressive sound of their earlier albums. On December 11th 2020, the song was performed live for the first time in 20 years via the band's online pay-per-view special, "Alive at Pachyderm Station".

References

External links
 Official page

Primus (band) songs
1999 songs
Songs about drugs
Interscope Records singles
Songs written by Les Claypool
Songs written by Larry LaLonde

1999 singles